Comet Pereyra (formal designations: C/1963 R1, 1963 V, and 1963e) was a bright comet which appeared in 1963. It was a member of the Kreutz Sungrazers, a group of comets which pass extremely close to the Sun.

Discovery 
The comet was first seen on 14 September 1963, by Z.M. Pereyra of Cordoba observatory in Argentina. British observer George Alcock later reported that he had observed a thin pencil-like beam of light low in the sky on 12 September, which may have been the comet's tail.

It was bright, at apparent magnitude 2, and had a short tail about 1 degree long. Over the next few days, the comet faded rapidly, having evidently already passed perihelion, although its tail grew to about 10° in length by late September. During its short period of naked eye visibility it was widely observed throughout the southern hemisphere.

Orbital studies 
As the comet receded from the Sun, orbital studies showed that Pereyra had been a sungrazing comet, passing just 60,000 kilometres from the Sun's surface. Further analysis demonstrated that it was a member of the Kreutz Sungrazers, a group of comets all descended from one very large sungrazing comet which fragmented several centuries previously.

The Kreutz Sungrazers consist of two major subgroups, which are descended from further breakups of two different fragments of the original comet. Studies have shown that Pereyra is a member of the subgroup which includes the Great Comet of 1843 and the Great Comet of 1882, although the separation of Pereyra from the larger fragment probably occurred one orbit before the two Great Comets separated.

References

Sources 
 Marsden B.G. (1967), The sungrazing comet group, Astronomical Journal, v. 72, p. 1170 
 Marsden B.G. (1989), The sungrazing comet group. II, Astronomical Journal, v. 98, p. 2306 
 Sekanina Z. (1967), Definitive orbit of Comet Pereyra (1963 V), Bulletin of the Astronomical Institute of Czechoslovakia, v. 18, p.229

External links 
 cometography.com

Pereyra
1963 in science